Chennamaneni Vidyasagar Rao (born 12 February 1941) is an Indian politician from Telangana, associated with Bharatiya Janata Party. He served as Governor of Maharashtra from 2014 to 2019. As a member of the Bharatiya Janata Party, he had served as a Union Minister of State in the Ministry of Home Affairs in Atal Bihari Vajpayee's government from 1999. He was elected to the Lok Sabha in 1998 and 1999 (13th Lok Sabha) from Karimnagar (Lok Sabha constituency).

Early life
He was born in Nagaram, Sircilla district on 12 February 1941 to C. Srinivasa Rao and Chandramma. He has three brothers. He completed his schooling in Vemulawada, PUC in Hyderabad, B.Sc. in Nanded of Maharashtra and later studied law at Osmania University.

Legal and political career

As a lawyer and politician 
After completion of law, he started working as lawyer. He was elected as convener (Chairman) of Janasangh, Karimnagar in 1972. He went to jail during the emergency period. He represented the BJP in Andhra Pradesh Legislative Assembly from Metpally assembly segment from 1985 to 1998 and entered into the Parliament by winning Karimnagar Lok Sabha constituency in 1998 and in 1999. He was also the BJP state president in 1998. His leadership in assembly has lifted party's profile in the state. Shri Rao had been Floor Leader of his party in the Andhra Pradesh Legislative Assembly for 15 years. He was successful in piloting a private member’s bill in the Andhra Pradesh Legislative Assembly that sought stringent punishment for people practicing bigamy. His Padyatra to Ichampalli in the year 1998 as the then BJP president highlighting the need to utilize Godavari waters for the needs of the people of Telangana led the Government to consider the project seriously.

As a minister 
He was Union minister of State for Home affairs in the cabinet of Atal Behari Vajpayee in 1999. Later, his portfolio was changed to Union Minister of state for Commerce and Industry.

As a governor 
He was appointed a governor of Maharashtra on 30 August 2014. His appointment was issued by 13th President of India, Mr.Pranab Mukherjee after the resignation of K. Sankaranarayanan. His oath was administered by Chief Justice of Bombay High Court Mohit Shah. On 26 September 2014, he accepted the resignation of Prithviraj Chavan as his party had no majority, and President's Rule was imposed on Maharashtra. He held additional charge as governor of Tamil Nadu from 2 September 2016 to 6 October 2017.

Personal life 
His wife's name is Vinoda. His elder brothers are C. Rajeshwara Rao, a former Communist leader, C. Hanumantha Rao who was the chancellor of Hyderabad Central University and C. Venkateshwara Rao.

References

|-

|-

|-

External links

India MPs 1998–1999
Telugu people
India MPs 1999–2004
People from Karimnagar district
1941 births
Living people
Union Ministers from Telangana
People from Telangana
Lok Sabha members from Andhra Pradesh
Telangana politicians
Bharatiya Janata Party politicians from Telangana
Indians imprisoned during the Emergency (India)
Governors of Maharashtra